City of Night is a 1963 novel by John Rechy.

City of Night may also refer to:

 City of Night (Koontz and Gorman novel), a 2005 novel by Dean Koontz and Ed Gorman

Songs
 "City of Night", by Bruce Springsteen from The Promise, 2010
 "City of Night", by Phixx from Electrophonic Revolution, 2004
 "City of Night", by Pink Martini from Hey Eugene!, 2010
 "City of Night", by Rational Youth from Cold War Night Life, 1982
 "City of Night (Berlin)", by Peter Schilling from The Different Story (World of Lust and Crime), 1989

See also
 City of Endless Night, a 2018 novel by Douglas Preston and Lincoln Child
 Cities of the Red Night, a 1981 novel by William S. Burroughs
 "The City of Dreadful Night", a 1870s poem by James B.V. Thomson
 Night and the City (disambiguation)
 Night in the city (disambiguation)
 Night city (disambiguation)